Helga Nõu (née Raukas; born 22 September 1934 in Tartu) is an Estonian writer, best known for her novels Kass sööb rohtu (1965), Tiiger, tiiger (1969), and Pea suu! (1983). She is married to Enn Nõu. She was invested with the Order of the White Star in 2001.

References 

1934 births
Living people
20th-century Estonian women writers
21st-century Estonian women writers
Estonian women novelists
Estonian translators
Recipients of the Order of the White Star, 5th Class
Estonian World War II refugees
Estonian emigrants to Sweden
Writers from Tartu